Knut Strøm  is a Norwegian handball player.

He made his debut on the Norwegian national team in 1959, 
and played 28 matches for the national team between 1959 and 1964. He participated at the 1961 and 1964 World Men's Handball Championship.

References

Year of birth missing (living people)
Living people
Norwegian male handball players